The University of Limerick Vikings are the American football team from the University of Limerick in Limerick, Ireland.  The team currently competes in the American Football Ireland Division One.  The Vikings have won three IAFL Shamrock Bowl titles – in 2007, 2008 and 2009 and the Atlantic Cup in 2010. 

The Vikings' all-time record is 54–30–4 (0.580).

History

1999–2006
Established in 1999, the team played mostly flag football until late 2001, when they joined the IAFL winter league.

In UL's first-ever game, they took the field on the road to the eventual Shamrock Bowl champion Dublin Rebels and were beaten 48–0. The Vikings lost their first four games, but on 2 December 2001, they recorded their first-ever win, 12–8, over the Dublin Dragons in Limerick, with touchdowns from Tommy Conneelly and Paddy "The Saint" Ryan.

In 2002, the Vikings won every game they played thanks to a powerful team of mostly American exchange students.  As league champions, they progressed directly to the Shamrock Bowl.  However, as most of the American students had returned home, UL was well beaten by the Carrickfergus Knights, 66–0.

The Vikings decided that for the long-term benefit of the team, they couldn't rely on exchange students as much as they had been doing.  The 2003 and 2004 seasons were devoted to building a base of home-grown Irish players.  Despite going winless during both of those seasons, the Vikings recruited the core of the future Shamrock Bowl-winning teams, including Liam Ryan and Kieran Coen.

In 2005, the much improved Vikings snapped their three-year, 13-game losing streak with a 26–22 victory over rival Cork Admirals, and narrowly missed the playoffs, finishing with a 3–5 record.
Buoyed by their promising 2005 campaign, the Vikings made the playoffs their goal in 2006.  With the team becoming more and more popular around Limerick, the Vikings had another strong recruiting class and the team was made up of mostly Irish players, although they were helped by the arrival of four American exchange students – Chris Bassitt, Jeremiah Sexton, Alex Smith and Seamus Hogan.
The 2006 UL Vikings finished the season with a 5–2–1 record, led by their defence, which gave up only 6 points in five home games.
The Vikings made the postseason for the first time in four years.  Aided by the return of former players Kieran Coen and Dan Levy, UL defeated the Carrickfergus Knights on the road to make the Shamrock Bowl for the second time in the team's short history.  However, a very strong Dublin Rebels team upended the Vikings 44–12 to claim their fourth consecutive Shamrock Bowl victory.
Despite the defeat, the team had managed to turn a corner by making the Shamrock Bowl with a young, almost exclusively Irish team.

2007
The Vikings had their greatest season ever in 2007.  Winning every game they played (the sole loss coming by way of a forfeit due to field unavailability against Cork) in dominant fashion – their smallest margin of victory being 16 points.
The Vikings league best defence allowed more than 6 points in a game only once, in a 36–20 road victory over the Cork Admirals, and the offence was equally as dominant, averaging almost 43 points a game and scoring at least four touchdowns in every game, led by an overpowering O-Line and strong running game.

The Vikings entered the playoffs as Shamrock Bowl favourites, but had to get past a 4th-seeded Belfast Bulls team in the semi-finals, eventually winning by a dominating 44–2 scoreline. This led to the first ever all-Munster Shamrock Bowl against the Cork Admirals, which was held at the UL Sports Grounds on 29 July. The Vikings won a close fought match by a margin of 22–14 courtesy of three rushing touchdowns from game MVP Seamus Hogan to claim their first-ever Shamrock Bowl title.

2008
The Vikings finished the 2008 regular season with a 7–1 record, winning their second consecutive Southern Division title. The sole loss came at home at the hands of fellow Shamrock Bowl finalists Dublin Rebels.  The Vikings returned most of the starters from the 2007 season, including MVP Seamus Hogan, and added former Chicago Slaughter offensive lineman Jim Davis to their roster.
After a slow start offensively in their first two games, the Vikings decided to move Seamus Hogan back to running back and appointed JP Nerbun as their starting QB.  Nerbun went on to lead the league in passing efficiency, throwing 15 touchdowns and no interceptions in four games as starter, while Hogan recorded at least one touchdown in every game of the season, except for the defeat against the Dublin Rebels, where he left the game injured after the first series.
The Vikings finished as the number two seeds, and after easily defeating the Belfast Trojans 42–8 in the semi-final, proceeded to their third consecutive Shamrock Bowl.  The bowl took place on 10 August at CIT Stadium in Cork against the number one seeded Dublin Rebels. A rushing touchdown from MVP Adrian Garvey, and an interception return for a touchdown from Darragh 'Plum' O'Callaghan gave the Vikings a 14–3 lead going into half-time, and thanks to a blocked field goal by Glen Carr in the fourth quarter, the Vikings won their second Shamrock Bowl in two years, defeating the Rebels 14–12.

2009
The 2009 season saw the Vikings return the core of their team from 2008, but lost linemen Jim Davis and Kieran Coen to the Valencia Firebats of the Spanish League.

The Vikings once again relied upon power running and a tough, fast defence to make the playoffs for the fourth year in a row, but they once again fell to the Dublin Rebels, this time 12–7 at home.
The Vikings finished as the number two seed for the third year in a row, and met the physical Carrickfergus Knights at home in the semi-finals, where they welcomed back Davis and Coen, who had helped lead Valencia to victory in the Spanish Bowl.  Leading 20–0 at half time, the game was abandoned shortly after the break when a Knights player was seriously injured, and the Vikings advanced to their fourth Shamrock Bowl in a row.

The Vikings met the Dublin Rebels in Belfast for Shamrock Bowl XXIII.  In a close, physical game, the score was tied at 6–6 after four-quarters, which meant the Shamrock Bowl would go into overtime for the first time in the game's history.
The Rebels won the toss and elected to receive the ball, but two plays into the extra period, Rebels' QB Andy Dennehy was intercepted by Vikings' CB JP Nerbun to set up a game winning 30-yard field goal attempt.  UL kicker Daniel Smith converted it successfully and the Vikings claimed their third Shamrock Bowl in three years.

2010
The Vikings continued the success of recent years by reaching the playoffs for the fifth successive year. Helped by the addition of rookies Shane Gleeson at centre and Sean Sheehy at corner back, the team was once again led by a strong running game and a physical defence on their way to a 6–1–1 record.  Their only defeat once again came at the hands of perennial championship rivals, the Dublin Rebels.
In June 2010, the Vikings won their first international title, by winning the second EFAF Atlantic Cup, held in Dublin. This win, along with their consistent domestic success, elevated the Vikings into the EFAF Top 20 rankings for the first time in the team's history, debuting at No. 19.

The Vikings success in the Atlantic Cup resulted in them being named the IFAF Team of the Month for June 2010 – the first Irish team ever to win this award.

The Vikings proceeded to their fifth Shamrock Bowl in five years by beating the Carrickfergus Knights 20–0 in their Shamrock Bowl semi-final.
The Vikings failed to make it four Shamrock Bowl victories in a row as they lost in the Shamrock Bowl to the No. 1 seed Dublin Rebels, 15–0.

2011
In 2011, the Vikings claimed their second regular season league title, and first undefeated regular season, going 8–0.  Although they were unbeaten on the field in 2007, because of a forfeit given up to Cork, the Vikings finished with a 7–1 record and the Dublin Rebels claimed the league crown.  The Vikings came close to the kind of dominance seen in the 2007 season.  Their only close regular season game was a 6–3 road victory over the Dublin Rebels.  The offence averaged 36.8 points per game, while the defence gave up only 4.3 points per game in the four games they played.  The last four games of the season were not contested, as forfeits by UCD, Cork and the Dublin Dragons (twice) gave the Vikings four default 30–0 wins.

In the playoffs, the Vikings defeated the Craigavon Cowboys in the Shamrock Bowl semi-final, and faced the Dublin Rebels at Morton Stadium in Shamrock Bowl XXV on 31 July.  Despite leading the game 13–8 at half time through a Marc Ashworth TD run, and a TD catch by Breandán Curtin from Ashworth, the Vikings were defeated by a score of 14–13 thanks to a 4th quarter Sam Hodgins touchdown for the Rebels.

2012
In 2012, the Vikings dominated the regular season, they again went undefeated. The season opener was one the Vikings had looked forward to for 18 months against college team Trinity. The last time they came to Limerick they defeated the Vikings in triple over time and won the College Bowl. With running back James Twomey running through trinity defenders all day the points soon racked up, other scorers included Sean Goldrick and Adrian Garvey. The best play of the game a pick six for Veteran Liam Ryan who ran from 40 yards out he ran behind a wall of Vikings blocking, cutting to the left hand side of the pitch, the trinity quarter back was close to Ryan he turned to tackle the experienced safety but was to be met with the biggest hit of the day when veteran d-lineman/centre Shane Gleeson blocked the QB to allow Ryan to stroll into the endzone . The game finished up 55–8, the touchdown allowed came from the reputable Rob McDowell who has gone on to become the biggest nuisance to any team playing trinity.

After the perfect start to their season the Vikings played the Craigavon Cowboys 3 weeks later. A repeat of last year's semi-final same teams same place, the Vikings were rampant again in their second game scoring 43 unanswered points as the Vikings defence stepped it up in a shutout performance. Scores coming from receivers Twomey, Curtin and Goldrick thrown by QB's Ashworth and Garvey.

Game Three was the long trek from Limerick all the way up to old rivals the Carrickfergus Knights. The Vikings went there to make a statement and that they did defeating the Knights 55–13. The Knights points coming from Gary "Potter" McElkerky a player who has ended up with the ball in the Vikings end zone several times in recent years. Despite the scoreline in the first half the game was a lot closer than you would expect of a game so high in scoring, with just seconds left in the first half the knights went for a field goal if successful would leave the sides at 7–3 for the whistle. The Vikings experience in this department showed by not only blocking the points but Seamus Hogan scooped up the pig skin saw a ray of light and ran the length of the pitch to make the score 15–0 and make even more of an upward struggle for the knights after such a deflating play. The stand out player of this game was by far Craig Switzer, the previous years special teams player of the year put his skills to work with 3 picks all ran back for substantial yards.

Game Four the Vikings play the third ranked college team in the league, U.C.D in Belfield. Belfield holds a bit of history for the Vikings as it was here they defeated the Leylstad commanders to become the first Irish team to win the Atlantic cup. The Vikings rushed to a 21-point lead in the first quarter, however U.C.D impressed by having a great attitude and not letting their heads drop and battled it out and put more points on the Vikings than any other team in the regular season, 16. The U.C.D boys despite a brave stand couldn't handle the Vikings in the end and finished up with a respectable 38–16, which would turn out to be the Vikings narrowest regular season victory.

Game Five old Munster rivals meet in Limerick, The Cork Admirals @ U.L Vikings is always a game Coach O' Sullivan has pencilled in his diary. Despite a dismal season last year for the Cork team they had bounced back this season rejuvenated, recording impressive victories, including a 26–0 win over the Rhino's, second seed in the north. The Vikings went to work on Cork scoring 34 points in the first half, a ten-yard rushing touch down by 2008 and 2009 shamrock bowl M.V.P Adrian Garvey and a spectacular 45-yard touch down pass by the Marc Ashworth / Sean Goldrick unit. The Admirals just could not get the ball moving especially not with the intense pressure coming from the Viking front 4, made up of Alan O' Carroll, Glen Carr, Kieran Coen and this year's d-line addition Ian Cahill who has fitted in comfortably with the three league veterans. Other scores included a 6-yard toss form Ashworth to Curtin and on Craig Switzers first ever offensive play he scored a 75-yard touchdown sweep on his rivals. The second half of the game was a struggle for both teams as it was littered with flags due to the Vikings indiscipline and a defensive stand from the Admirals they were able to control the Vikings and keep them scoreless in the second half, making the second half finish the same as the first 34–0, pushing the Vikings 5–0 record.

Game Six as always the regular season game of all games. Possibly the toughest and deepest rivalry in the league, ever certainly of the last decade sporting 16 shamrock bowl appearances between them in the past ten years, with 5 appearances against each other at the big stage, the Rebels currently winning the ShamrockBowl shootout 3–2, they took the lead in last year's final when they narrowly defeated the Vikings to become champions taking the lead by one point in the fourth quarter thanks to a touchdown by Sam Hodgins... very similar in every sense to the Vikings dramatic 1 point victory over Leylstad thanks to a fourth-quarter touchdown by Adrian Garvey in 2010. While this game was no bowl it still had significant meaning. Both teams at this stage were undefeated at 5–0 and the winner was sure to go on and top their division to secure a home semi-final, the loser would be almost guaranteed to have to take the hard route to the semi's being forced to play another game and then face an away semi-final against most likely the Belfast Trojans (who also managed to go undefeated in the reg season in the northern division). 
The first quarter went by 0–0 what looked to become another defensive battle that these two teams have taken part in so many times during their long 10-year war, this soon changed as James Twomey ran for 60 yards for a fantastic rushing touchdown; however, it was called back over a flag, deja vu of last year's regular season game where Twomey was called back on a 70-yard rushing TD against the same opponents. The man to break the deadlock was the new Vikings special teams captain Sean Goldrick (last year's rookie of the year) after he broke tackles and sprinted 45 yards for a TD after Garvey connected with him. The Rebels got the ball back and wanted to level the scores before the half driving down the Vikings pitch bending the Viking d to their limit until the usual dominating Rebels veteran quarterback Dennehy threw a pass that was intercepted by a player who has also been dominating the IAFL for years and years, Vikings captain Liam Ryan, who over the years has developed the skills to become a take balls out of the air that he has no right to. This stopped the Rebels drive and looked all set for the Vikes to go into the half with an 8–0 lead, with 3 seconds left on the clock of the first half, Marc Ashworth pitched the ball to Adrian Garvey, who ran 61 yards. Garvey had excellent blocking but still had a lot to do, running straight through two Rebels defenders.

The Vikings very aware that their 2-touchdown halftime lead was the same lead they had at half time in the bowl last year and were not prepared to throw this one away. 
New addition Dayton Mcpherson and Veteran Brendan McCarthy put in some monster hits in the second half and were often seen in the backfield being a constant problem for the Rebels, all with the help of that destructive d line that were getting pressure on Dennehy all day long. It is no surprise that the Rebels had trouble on offence when the Limerick defence put in their best performance in recent history. The unsung heroes as usual were the Vikings offensive line creating gaps for the Vikings allowing them to keep the chains moving, Paul Keane also helped to keep the chains moving with a few crucial first downs. The sheer power and strength of Adrian Garvey proved to much for the rebels defence again in the second half as Garvey ran in two more touchdowns both from within the Rebels' redzone.

Game 7 The Vikings travelled to Dublin to face the Dragons, and win 61–0.
Game 8 The Vikings faced newcomers to the league Tullamore Phoenix, winning and securing top seed in the IAFL.

2013
In 2013, the Vikings entered a rebuilding year. After the heartbreak of previous seasons many veteran players retired from football leaving the Vikings with the task of re-inventing themselves. They competed in the newly formed SBC South and finished with a 6–2 record. For the second time in 3 years the Vikings season was hampered by forfeits and teams no fulfilling fixtures. As DCU left the league before the season the south was left with 4 teams. Then things got worse the Cork Admirals folded after just one game leaving the south with 3 teams and none of those teams getting the normal 8 games. The Vikings lost 2 of 3 fixtures with Trinity meaning they would qualify as the second seed in the south. The highlight of the regular season being a 13–12 victory over Trinity in Limerick.

The Vikings found themselves in unknown territory in the wild card spot and were nearly caught napping by a gutsy UCD team in their first ever playoff game. The Vikings turned to the ever reliable Adrian Garvey to score a last minute Touchdown which separated the teams. As with the whole season the Vikings struggled to find an identity on offence but their Defence was playing at an extremely high standard keeping their hopes of a trip to the Shamrock bowl alive. After this tough encounter the Vikings would face the Defending champion Belfast Trojans who themselves were undefeated in Football, domestic and European, in 2 years.

This game was part of a double header at the Garda RFC Westmanstown. The Vikings entering the game as huge underdogs for the first time in many years. Making matters worse the Vikings lost starting QB Marc Ashworth and Starting RB Ryan Meches to unforeseen circumstances leaving them with a 22-man squad facing the Champions. The game started positively for the Vikings on offence gathering some first downs and field position. The Defence which was the story of the day matched the champions in every aspect and looked a better outfit than the one that lost to Belfast in the Shamrock bowl the year before. As the first half came to a close the score was a measly 0–0 with both teams showing why they have been dominant in Irish football in recent years. The Vikings cam out in the second half hoping to get some movement on offence with their Defence continuing to be Dominant and impressive. The Vikings turned to players like ever present Kieran Coen to play both sides of the ball and he was the best player on the field on the day. With many other players such as Ian Cahill, Craig Switzer, Michael Guinane, Kieran Coen, Adrian Garvey and Sean Goldrick playing Offence, Defence and Special teams the game started to wear on the Vikings. 0–0 entering the 4th quarter in unprecedented 28-degree heat there was an air of inevitability about the game with the Vikings continually running 3 and outs on offence something had to give. With less than 10 minutes left and the Trojans creeping into Viking territory there was a sense that a big play needed to be made on Defence if they were going to have a shot of knocking off the Trojans. That chance came with a well read pass from the Trojans QB by Craig Switzer. The ball in his hands with 60 yards of clear field in front of the speedster nickel star of the Vikings and he took his eye off the ball and it fell on the turf. The crowd, the team and everyone else knew that was the chance and sure enough 3 plays later the Trojans constant Barrage finally broke the Vikings Defensive wall and ran in for a 20-yard score with 7 minutes left. The Trojans stopped the Vikings offence after some gutsy first downs by QB Paul Keane, RB/DL Ian Cahill and WR Sean Goldrick. The Trojans played the clock down to minutes left and with the game getting away from them the Vikings Defence gave up another score leaving it 14–0 final score.

The Vikings came into the game with great confidence internally but none by the wider league. They showed what it meant to be Vikings on that day player all phases and pushing the Undefeated Champions, who won the Bowl by a huge margin against the Dublin Rebels, to their limits. It was not enough and in the end a 22-man squad could not last against the huge numbers and freshness of the Belfast Trojans team. Many players felt it was one of the gutsiest Vikings performances in recent years but just not good enough. Excellent young players like Sean Goldrick, Ian Cahill, Paul Keane, Shane Gleeson and Eoin Whelan matured on the field and bode well for the Future of the team. Overall, the Vikings learned the hard way that you can't win if you don't score no matter how good your Defence is as was the story of their entire season and many seasons past. The future is bright for this new generation of Vikings and keep a close eye on 2014 which is sure to be a huge one for this team.

2014
The 2014 Season began early for the Vikings with an intervarsity championship planned for 17 November. New Head Coach Paul Gilhool and Defensive Coordinator Glen Carr worked to get their student players ready for the upcoming games. The Vikings would face UCD in a semi-final at 11.30 am with the winner then playing Trinity at 2.30 pm on the same day. The Vikings were unfortunate to lose the very talented upcoming player Dylan Quigley to injury just 10 days before the game with Team/Defensive Captain Ian Cahill picking up a significant injury on the same night. The Vikings with a largely Rookie squad and new players in almost every position played well against UCD winning 13–0 in a game Dominated by the Vikings defence, you can change the people but not the team. Some outstanding play by Eoin Whelan, Kevin Flaherty, Ray Burke, Brian Kelly and newly acquired hard hitting Spanish safety Alvaro "nobody suspects the Spanish inquisition" Martinez among others led the Defence and some tough running by the Vikings new RB Shane Gleeson and crafty new QB Alexandre Indjeyan. The Vikings then had only time to change their shirts before a showdown with Trinity for the championship.

The Vikings boosted by return of Captain Ian Cahill for the final felt it was time for them to win their first silverware since 2010. However, the Trinity team who had scouted the previous game and had fresh legs started quick and were 2 scores up within the first quarter. The Vikings rattled responded positively with some outstanding Defensive play from the entire squad Ian Cahill, Donogh Flannery, Pat Noonan, Brian Kelly, Rob Crimin, Lorcan Crean, Ray Burke, Craig Switzer, Kevin Flaherty, Bono and Alvaro. However, despite several turnovers the Vikings offence struggled and the 2 games started to take their toll on an impressive offensive line. The Vikings played out the game and ultimately the scores remained 14–0. The Vikings battled valiantly with their most impressive rookie class in memory which surely bode well for the coming season. Impressive displays by the entire team and toughness shown by the offence through their struggles showed positive signs for the Vikings going forward. The Vikings then regrouped and disbanded before pre-season training began again in mid-January. With some hard work on offence and continued effort on Defence the Vikings team looks like it's ready for big things n 2014.

2019 

The Vikings competed in the Shamrock Bowl Conference this season, however after losing a number of players from their 2018 season, the Vikings faced an uphill challenge to survive in the division. After three tough close losses to the Trojans, Rhinos and Rebels despite strong performances from Adrian Garvey on Offense and Kurt Mackey on Defense the Vikings were in a 0-3 hole. Strong squads from UCD and Cork Admirals visited Limerick, who were playing in UL Bohemians RFC as the Maguires Field upgrades took place, and both teams defeated the Vikings pretty comprehensively. Sitting at 0-5 and with three away games left in Belfast and Dublin (including a game vs the eventual Shamrock Bowl participants South Dublin Panthers) the task looked pretty impossible to stay up in the SBC. The Vikings would need to win all three remaining games in order to preserve their SBC status. The Vikings went on the road and put the shoulder to the boulder, gritting out a huge team win in Belfast vs the Knights. The game featured a particularly impressive performance from Adrian Garvey at QB as well as some clutch plays from Reece Moloney, forcing a fumble off an interception return and Darragh Murray catching the game winning TD in the final moments of the game. Next up on the road were the Dublin Rhinos and the Vikings finally put a full team performance together with all 3 teams executing well and pulling out a 30-0 victory. QB Liam Ryan turned back the years, putting in a three TD performance and igniting the Vikings Offense.

Last up was a trip to the South Dublin Panthers which featured a couple of former Vikings, adding even more fuel to the fire. The Vikings had to win to stay up, the Panthers had secured their playoff spot and were preparing for their SBC run. Vikings RB Jason O'Leary had a career game with over 100 yards rushing on the ground, making the difference between the teams. The Vikings survived a late comeback charge led by Panthers QB Ian Cahill and won a tight game 13-7.

2022 
The 2022 season saw the Vikings drop down a division for the first time in their history and compete in the AFI Division One. It was a decision taken by the coaching team, Head Coach Darragh O'Callaghan and OC Liam Ryan, and AFI due to the number of inexperienced players and rookies on the Vikings squad due to players moving on from UL and no recruitment for two years on campus. It turned out to be a fantastic decision as the Vikings rookies gained experience and flourished in the AFI Division One. The season also saw a return to on-campus games in UL with the completion of the Maguires Field upgrades. UL now has by far the best American Football facilities of any team in Ireland with a high quality, dedicated 100 yard pitch with proper American Football goalposts, music and announcer at games as well as bringing in Livestreaming facilities towards the end of the season. The 2022 season has laid the foundations of the club to be successful for the next number of years. 

An early season 12-6 victory in Limerick vs Wexford Eagles set the tone for the season with close games and tough football being the trend of the year. The Vikings then took on Trinity College in Dublin. Trinity were a strong team, buoyed by a number of American players and it finished a close 6-0 loss to the Vikings. However, the Vikings were quickly finding their identity on Defence and Offense. The next game saw Vikings rookie QB, Kieran Gilhool, son of former Head Coach Paul Gilhool, take up the QB1 spot after an injury to Eoin Rudkins. This change sparked an offensive explosion with an absolute shootout vs Cill Dara Crusaders, the game ending 47-39 in favour of the Vikings. WR/RB Sean Grace (3TDs) and WR Danny Quilter (2TDs) showed that the Vikings could pair an explosive offense with their increasingly strong defence. 

Next up was a run of home games with the Donegal/Derry Vipers coming to UL and grinding out a 10-10 draw in the rain in Limerick. It was a tough, physical match which prepared our young squad for the challenges that would come later in the season. After that match, the Vikings were delighted to host Centre College Football, an NCAA Division III football program in UL for an exhibition game. It was a fun day out and an excellent learning opportunity for the UL squad. The following week saw the Westmeath Minotaurs come to town, again in heavy rain, and UL suffered their heaviest defeat of the season, losing 16-0 against a strong Minotaurs team. They had size and experience advantages all over the field but the Vikings took resolve from that defeat and intensity in training amped up quite a bit after that. In our return visit to Mullingar, we reversed the result with a 26-6 victory against the Minotaurs with exceptional displays from DEs Rob Browne and Jake Kelly pressuring the QB Joe Kinahan. It also saw the development of rookie RB sensation Aidan Maher. Aidan had been grafting hard all year and gaining lots of yards but had yet to score a TD. Once he got his first, the floodgates opened and he scored 4 in total on the day which took him top of the rushing TDs list for the regular season. 

By beating Westmeath, UL guaranteed themselves a home semi final and the Cill Dara Crusaders won their final game of the season to secure their spot vs UL. Again it was an exciting, offensive game with both teams driving the ball down the field. The Vikings took control early with an Aidan Maher TD and never relinquished the lead. However, Cill Dara, lead by QB Jordan Farrell kept in touch with UL despite two Adam Keane INTs. QB Kieran Gilhool marshalled his offense to control the clock, gain first downs and close the game out. The Vikings were going back to a Bowl game for the first time since 2012 and it seemed to be destined to be round 3 vs Westmeath. 

The Bowl game was played in Newforge Sports grounds as part of an AFI Double Header which was a fantastic occasion. The Vikings started brightly with QB Gilhool passing to WR Martin Rothschild for his first TD of the season in the back corner of the end zone. The drive was built on a strong running game with RBs Aidan Maher, Darren Enright and Adam O'Mahony picking up excellent yards on the ground. The O line of John Cannon, Ben Thompson (son of Viking Legend Mark Thompson), Chris O'Mahony, Karl Mallon and James Pelham-Burn opened lanes vs a large and aggressive Minotaurs defense. The Vikings D, picking up where it left off in Mulligar, continued to pressure the Westmeath QB and DE Rob Browne racked up a number of sacks on the game. One putting QB1 out of the game. However the Westmeath O continued to drive through star WR Jack Lynch and they tied the game with a TD from Lynch. Aidan Maher quickly responded with a TD of his own but a rushing TD from Westmeath again tied the game. An audacious call from Westmeath to squib/onside kick on the restart took the Vikings by surprise and Westmeath recovered the ball and kicked a FG to take the lead late in the game. QB Gilhool tried to take the Vikings down the field in the 2 minute drill but the Vikings came up short on the day. Westmeath were deserved winners and secured promotion to the Premier division in 2023. The Vikings return to UL to recruit, train and come back even better in 2023.

Season By Season records
Note: W = Wins, L = Losses, T = Ties

UL Vikings Individual Awards

UL Clubs & Societies 'Club Individual of the Year'

UL Vikings 'Viking of the Year'

UL Vikings 'MVP'

UL Vikings 'Offensive Player of the Year'

UL Vikings 'Defensive Player of the Year'

UL Vikings 'Special Teams Player of the Year'

UL Vikings 'Rookie of the Year'

UL Vikings 'Most Improved Player'

UL Vikings 'Lineman of the Year'

References

External links 
 
 

American football teams in the Republic of Ireland
Vik
University and college sports clubs in Ireland
1999 establishments in Ireland
American football teams established in 1999
Viking Age in popular culture